Carlos Rodrigo Mladinic Alonso (born 25 October 1954) is a Chilean politician who served as minister of State. He was a political panelist and columnist at Radio Cooperativa.

References

External links
 

1954 births
Living people
Chilean people of Croatian descent
University of Chile alumni
20th-century Chilean politicians
21st-century Chilean politicians
Christian Democratic Party (Chile) politicians